HK-47 is a fictional droid in the Star Wars franchise. Introduced in the 2003 video game Star Wars: Knights of the Old Republic, he is an extremely efficient assassin droid constructed by Revan to assist them in hunting Jedi, until both have their memories wiped and made to serve the Jedi themselves. Voiced by Kristoffer Tabori, HK-47 reappears in the 2004 sequel, Star Wars Knights of the Old Republic II: The Sith Lords, the Trials of Obi-Wan 2005 expansion pack to the massively multiplayer online game Star Wars Galaxies, and the 2011 MMORPG Star Wars: The Old Republic, as well as various other novels, short stories, comics, and video games in the Star Wars Expanded Universe.

Lucasfilm rebranded the Expanded Universe works as Star Wars Legends in 2014 and declared them non-canon to the franchise; however in the 2017 Chuck Wendig novel Star Wars: Aftermath: Empire's End, the recurring character of B-1 (Mister Bones) is revealed to have been built from parts of HK-47 to help the fledging New Republic against the leaderless Galactic Empire, briefly taking over the droid with their "strange, hard-angle" accent. The character will reappear in the 2022 Star Wars: Knights of the Old Republic — Remake, set within Star Wars canon.

Development
A BioWare developer posted to the company's forum that HK-47 is named in homage of a dropship in Shattered Steel. However, Knights of the Old Republic lead writer Drew Karpyshyn claimed the name derived from his billiards team's name, which in turn was partially derived from the AK-47; the "Mister Bones" nickname provided to the character's B-1 battle droid form introduced in Chuck Wendig's Star Wars: Aftermath trilogy is derived from how "B-dash-O-N-E, looks like Bone or Bones."

Appearances
In Knights of the Old Republic, the player's character purchases HK-47 on Tatooine. Dialogue establishes that Revan built the bloodthirsty droid, which characteristically refers to organic lifeforms as "meatbags".

HK-47 is disabled at the beginning of The Sith Lords; the player's character recovers material from damaged droids to repair HK-47. Dialogue in The Sith Lords expands on the droid's backstory and purpose, establishing that Revan used the droid to kill people who destabilized or weakened the galaxy.

In the time frame of the Trials of Obi-Wan expansion to Star Wars Galaxies, HK-47's artificial intelligence has transferred into a computer on a Galactic Republic cruiser that later crashed on Mustafar. The droid calls on players to complete several quests to return him to a droid body.

HK-47 was included as an action figure in the Champions of the Force line of Star Wars figures.

HK-47 returns in Star Wars: The Old Republic as a boss battle in two separate flashpoints and as a mini boss in a level 60 operation.

HK-47 is an unlockable character in the mobile game Star Wars: Galaxy of Heroes.

The B-1 battle droid known as "Mister Bones", rebuilt by New Republic supporter Temmin "Snap" Wexley from droid parts from a scrapyard, is revealed to have been built from parts of HK-47 in the 2017 Chuck Wendig novel Star Wars: Aftermath: Empire's End, with HK-47 briefly taking over Bones after they "glitch" and their voice "warps", causing their "strange, hard-angle" accent to return and say "COMMENTARY: I SAY WE BLAST THE MEATBAG AND SAVE YOU THE TROUBLE, MASTER". Following Bones' destruction at the end of the novel, their programming briefly reappears in Marvel Comics' Star Wars: Poe Dameron #13 in before being destroyed again; the character previously appeared in Star Wars: Aftermath (2015) and Star Wars: Aftermath: Life Debt (2016).

Promotion and reception
At the 2004 Game Developers Choice Awards, the HK-47 character won the category of "Original Game Character of the Year". The character also won Computer Gaming Worlds 2003 "NPC of the Year" award. GameSpot called the character one of the coolest characters of 2003, saying he was possibly the most original Star Wars character in years. GamesRadar listed HK-47 as the 3rd best conceived character in video gaming, calling him "cheerfully insane" and saying he was "[e]asily the highlight of the [Knights of the Old Republic] series". IGN chose the character as the 13th top Star Wars hero. GameDaily's Robert Workman called HK-47 one of his favourite characters from Star Wars video games. GameDaily's Chris Buffa also listed the assassin droid as one of their top 25 video game robots, praising its humour and in-game value. UGO Networks listed the character as one of the top 50 Star Wars expanded universe characters, noting his sarcastic personality made him unique among droids. GamesRadar's identified HK-47 as an example of BioWare's "Kickass Robot" character archetype, and listed it as one of the 25 best new characters of the decade, stating that Star Wars: Knights of the Old Republic and HK-47 had some of the best characterization in Star Wars history, adding that HK-47 was one of the most memorable characters in the game.

Empire listed HK-47 as the 43rd greatest video game character, calling him "brilliantly twisted". Dakota Grabowski of GameZone listed HK-47 as the second top BioWare created teammate, commenting that he delivered some of the best lines in Knights of the Old Republic. Game Informers Kimberley Wallace considered him to be one of the best BioWare characters, saying that "While BioWare's games have always had comic-relief characters, none have come close to the simple wisdom and mean-spiritedness of HK-47." Matt Miller from the same magazine called HK-47 the second top AI character of the decade, commenting that if the player chose to go light-side, then "he is a perfect counter to your heroic actions". In 2010, Game Informer ranked HK-47 at #15 in "The Top 30 Characters who Defined a Decade" list, who called him the best character in Knights of the Old Republic. The magazine noted that his personality and humour "[held] a mirror to Revan's dual history with both sides of the Force", saying that he highlighted the overarching Star Wars theme of everyone having both good and evil in them. HK-47 was also voted as the 18th top character of the decade by Game Informer'''s readers. GameSpy's Mike Sharkey called HK-47 a noticeable omission from the 2011 Guinness World Records Gamer's Editions top 50 video game characters. A reader's poll published by IGN in December 2014 for their top ultimate RPG party choices, drawing from characters of several disparate RPG video game franchises, placed HK-47 at #13 under the "Reserves" section. Gamestm named HK-47's one of BioWare’s 8 most memorable companion characters. Evan Lahti from PC Gamer named HK-47 as his personal favorite Bioware companion, commenting "For all the well-rounded, nonarchetypal, and sensitive characters BioWare has thrown at us, I delight in the silliest, most murderous, and one-dimensional partner they've written." In a 2017 article, PC Gamer staff included HK-47 in their definitive list of the best RPG squad mates around. HK-47 placed second on App Trigger's'' list of the 10 Best BioWare Companions.

References

External links
HK-47 at the Star Wars Databank

Anthropomorphic video game characters
BioWare characters
Fictional assassins in video games
Fictional henchmen in video games
Fictional linguists
Fictional mass murderers
Fictional polyglots
Male characters in video games
Robot characters in video games
Science fantasy video game characters
Star Wars animated characters
Star Wars droid characters
Star Wars Legends characters
Star Wars video game characters
Video game bosses
Video game characters introduced in 2003
Video game sidekicks
Star Wars: Knights of the Old Republic characters